Tida Sok Puos or Snake Hair is a 1973 Khmer film directed by Hui Kung starring Kong Som Eun, Dy Saveth, and Mandoline.

Cast
Kong Som Eun
Dy Saveth
Mandoline

References

Cambodian horror films
1973 films
Cambodian fantasy films